is a Japanese actor, best known for the leading role of Sousuke Esumi/Go-On Red in the 2008 tokusatsu series Engine Sentai Go-onger.

Filmography
Television
 Nobuta wo produce as Takuzo Wakui (NTV, 2005)
 Toritsu Mizusho! as Okuta (NTV, 2006)
 Shinuka to Omotta in Case 3 (NTV, 2007)
 Hanazakari no Kimitachi e as Taiyo Ogimachi (Fuji TV, 2007)
 Engine Sentai Go-onger as Sousuke Esumi/Go-On Red (TV Asahi, 2008)
 Kaizoku Sentai Gokaiger as Sousuke Esumi (ep. 35-36) (TV Asahi, 2011)
 Ultraman Orb: The Origin Saga as Shohei Moriwaki (Amazon Prime, 2016 - 2017)

Film
 Engine Sentai Go-onger: Boom Boom! Bang Bang! GekijōBang!! (2008 Toei) as Sousuke Esumi/Go-On Red
 Engine Sentai Go-onger vs. Gekiranger (2009 Toei) as Sousuke Esumi/Go-On Red
 Samurai Sentai Shinkenger vs. Go-onger: GinmakuBang!! (2010 Toei) as Sousuke Esumi/Go-On Red
 Karate-Robo Zaborgar (2011) as The Younger Daimon
 Engine Sentai Go-onger: 10 Years Grand Prix (2018 Toei) as Sousuke Esumi/Go-on Red

Other media
Stage
 Switch (2007)

External links
Furuhara's website
Furuhara's Youtube

1986 births
Living people
Japanese male television actors
Male actors from Kyoto